Coleophora ramitella is a moth of the family Coleophoridae. It is found in the north-eastern United States.

The wingspan is about 11 mm.

References

ramitella
Moths of North America
Moths described in 1993